The Finnish Women's Cup is the national women's football cup competition in Finland and was first played in 1981.

List of finals
The list of finals:

See also
Finnish Cup, men's edition

References

External links
Website at suomencup.fi
Cup at women.soccerway.com

Finland Women
Women
Recurring sporting events established in 1981
Cup
1981 establishments in Finland